Johann Georg von Dillis (26 December 1759 – 28 September 1841) was a German painter.

Biography
He was born in Gmain near Dorfen. Son of a gamekeeper and forester, he was educated in Munich with support from the prince-elector of Bavaria. Initially he was trained for the priesthood, but by 1786 his real interest, art, was beginning to be developed, and he taught drawing both at court and to private families. In 1790 he was appointed inspector of the Hofgarten Galerie, the princely collection.

He continued in a curatorial role for the Bavarian court for much of the rest of his career; this allowed him some freedom to travel and expand his knowledge of European art.  In 1792 he traveled to Dresden, Prague, and Vienna, and in 1794 he made his first trip to Italy, where he made watercolor studies from nature. A further trip to Italy followed in 1805, and brought him to Rome, where he met Pierre-Henri de Valenciennes, who introduced him to the idea of painting in open air.

He studied the work of Simon Denis and Joseph Mallord William Turner, and encountered Washington Allston.  The next year, in Paris, he saw oil sketches by Jean-Joseph-Xavier Bidauld, and with Ludwig, the crown prince visited the Musée Napoleon; he would later advise the prince on collecting and other matters artistic, remaining in this capacity for the rest of his life.  He also made several trips to Italy to purchase art for the royal collection.

In 1816 he was made responsible for packing and returning to Munich from Paris art stolen from Bavaria by Napoleon.  In the fall of 1817 he and Ludwig traveled to Sicily before spending four months in Rome.  Dillis helped to shape the collections of the Alte Pinakothek, which opened in 1836.  He died in Munich in 1841.

See also
 List of German painters

References
Philip Conisbee, Sarah Faunce, and Jeremy Strick. In the Light of Italy: Corot and Early Open-Air Painting.  New Haven; Yale University Press, 1996.
Matthew Bargraves / Rachel Sloan: "A Dialogue with Nature - Romantic Landscapes from Britain and Germany". The Courtauld Gallery / The Morgan Library & Museum; London / New York, 2014.

External links

German masters of the nineteenth century: paintings and drawings from the Federal Republic of Germany, a full text exhibition catalog from The Metropolitan Museum of Art, which contains material on Johann Georg von Dillis (no. 22)

18th-century German painters
18th-century German male artists
German male painters
19th-century German painters
19th-century German male artists
1759 births
1841 deaths
Burials at the Alter Südfriedhof